Azzedine Rahim (born 31 March 1972 in Algiers), is a retired Algerian international footballer

Club career
Azzedine Rahim grew up in the Casbah and began playing football at USM Alger. He quickly made his mark, and in 1987 he played his first senior game at the age of 15 and a half against the USM El Harrach. While he is still only cadet. During the 1994-1995 season, he participated greatly in the accession of his club in the first division after five years spent in Division 2.

Injury
In 1996, Azzedine is at the height of his art and represents one of the greatest hopes of football Algerian. In advanced contacts with the Belgian Football Club of KV Mechelen, and in the viewfinder of other clubs, In France Olympique de Marseille Le Havre AC and Portugal, his career changed when, in the Algiers derby against the MC Alger, The defender Tarek Lazizi mowed him and severely injured him in the knee, causing him to rupture the cruciate and lateral ligaments. His convalescence lasts more than two years, and requires his departure in Salt Lake City, United States to benefit from Dr. Tom Rosenberg's.

Back
When he returned to the competition in 1999, Rahim did not succeed in winning the USMA, the player deplores the lack of confidence placed in him, despite the fact That the championship takes place without relegation. He then deposited his suitcases with Constantine to evolve in the local sporting club.

National team statistics

Honours
 Won the Algerian league one in 1996 with USM Alger
 Won the Algerian Cup twice in 1997 and 1999 with USM Alger

References

External links

1972 births
Living people
People from Algiers
Algerian footballers
Algeria international footballers
USM Alger players
ES Sétif players
JSM Béjaïa players
CA Bordj Bou Arréridj players
CS Constantine players
CA Batna players
Algerian Ligue Professionnelle 1 players
Association football forwards
21st-century Algerian people